Desean Kevin Terry is an American actor, acting coach and theatre director. He is best known for his recurring role in the television series The Morning Show (2019–present).

Filmography

Film

Television

Video games

Producer

References

External links
 

Living people
American male film actors
American male stage actors
American male television actors
American acting coaches
American theatre directors
21st-century American male actors
African-American male actors
African-American theater directors
Loyola Marymount University alumni
Juilliard School alumni
Year of birth missing (living people)
Place of birth missing (living people)
21st-century African-American people